The 2014 Asian Aerobic Gymnastics Championships were the fourth edition of the Asian Aerobic Gymnastics Championships, and were held in Gangwon, South Korea from November 19 to November 21, 2014.

Medal summary

Medal table

References

A
Asian Gymnastics Championships
International gymnastics competitions hosted by South Korea
2014 in South Korean sport